The contribution of travel and tourism to GDP was US$5,880.3bn (2.0% of total GDP) in 2016. Tourism generated 556,135 jobs (2.5% of total employment) in 2016. Foreign tourist visits were predicted to have risen from 0.6 million in 2007 to 4 million in 2017. Responsible tourism became a peremptory need for Colombia because it minimizes negative social, economic and environmental impacts and makes positive contributions to the conservation of natural and cultural heritage.

Colombia has major attractions for a tourist destination, such as Cartagena and its historic surroundings, which are on the UNESCO World Heritage List; the insular department of San Andrés, Providencia y Santa Catalina; and Santa Marta and the surrounding area. The coffee region is also a very popular destination, especially the traditional town of Salento, Quindío and its surroundings.  Fairly recently, Bogotá, the nation's capital, has become Colombia's major tourist destination because of its improved museums and entertainment facilities and its major urban renovations, including the rehabilitation of public areas, the development of parks, and the creation of an extensive network of cycling routes. With its very rich and varied geography, which includes the Amazon and Andean regions, the Llanos, the Caribbean and Pacific coasts, and the deserts of La Guajira and Tatacoa Desert, and its unique biodiversity, Colombia also has major potential for ecotourism.

History 
Indigenous people inhabited what is now Colombia by 12,500 BCE. In 1500, Rodrigo de Bastidas was the first Spanish explorer of the Caribbean coast. In 1510, Vasco Núñez de Balboa founded the town of Santa María la Antigua del Darién. Throughout Colombia's history there were several rebel movements against Spanish rule, but most were unsuccessful. In 1810 the rebels, led by Simón Bolívar were successful and achieved independence from Spain.

Colombia was the first constitutional government in South America, and the Liberal and Conservative parties, founded in 1848 and 1849 respectively, are two of the oldest surviving political parties in the Americas.Slavery was abolished in the country in 1851. The United States of America's intentions to influence the area (especially the Panama Canal construction and control) led to the separation of the Department of Panama in 1903 and the establishment of it as a nation.

In the early to mid-1980s, international tourism arrivals in Colombia reached nearly 1.4 million per year. Although they decreased by more than half thereafter, they have recovered at rates of more than 10 percent annually since 2002, reaching 1.9 million visitors in 2006. Tourism usually has been considered a low-growth service industry in Colombia because of internal violence, but in 2006 the country earned US$2 billion from international tourism. Tourists visiting Colombia from abroad came mainly from the United States (24.5 percent), followed by Venezuela (13.4 percent), Ecuador (9.1 percent), Spain (6.4 percent), and Mexico (4.9 percent). Approximately 90 percent of foreign tourists arrive by air, 10 percent by land transportation, and a tiny share by sea.

The Democratic Security and Defense Policy of Álvaro Uribe Vélez (president between 2002 and 2010) organized tourist caravans (caravanas turísticas) to protect tourists and boost tourism. The caravans transported tourists to holiday celebration sites and were protected by military forces. The Democratic Security Policy's goal is to "reestablishing control over all of the nation's territory, fighting illegal drugs and organized crime, and strengthening the justice system." Another project to boost tourism and tourist safety in Colombia is the Proexport Colombia. The Ministry of Commerce, Industry and Tourism is the Colombian ministry in charge of tourism affairs.

Land and climate 
Colombia is located in the North West area of the South American continent. Colombia coasts are along the Caribbean Sea and Pacific Ocean. The Andes Mountains are within the borders of Colombia, and are a popular destination for tourists to hike.

Along the coast and in the northern areas of the country the climate is "warm and tropical ... with a rainy season from May to November." The temperature stays fairly consistent throughout the year because Colombia is so close to the equator. The variety in temperature comes from the level of altitude; it is much cooler in the higher altitudes of Colombia than the low land coastal areas.

Holidays 
Popular times to visit Colombia include the most famous festivals such as the Cali's Fair, the Barranquilla's Carnival, the Bogota Summer Festival, the Ibero-American Theater Festival, Blacks and Whites' Carnival in Pasto, Manizales fair the Flower Festival is when the most foreign tourists go to Colombia. Many people visit Colombia during Christmas time and the celebrations surrounding the Independence of Colombia. The Ministry of Tourism considers high seasons the Holy Week, the northern hemisphere summer months (June, July, August, September) and Christmas season. During the Holy Week many travel to the Caribbean Region of Colombia or visit popular landmarks like Las Lajas Cathedral, Salt Cathedral of Zipaquirá, Monserrate and Guadalupe Hill the towns of Santa Cruz de Mompox, villa de Leyva, Guamal or Popayán where Roman Catholic traditions and rituals are performed, among others. Colombia also hosts dozens of popular music festivals throughout the year, such as Rock al Parque and Estereo Picnic.

Music 

Colombia is known as "the land of a thousand rhythms". Colombia has more than 1,025 folk rhythms.

Some of the main genres are:

Visitors 
Most visitors arriving to Colombia on short-term basis in are from the following countries of nationality:

Ecotourism 

The great variety in geography, flora and fauna across Colombia has also resulted in the development of an ecotourist industry, concentrated in the country's national parks. Popular ecotourist destinations include: along the Caribbean coast, the Tayrona National Natural Park in the Sierra Nevada de Santa Marta mountain range and Cabo de la Vela on the tip of the Guajira Peninsula; the Nevado del Ruiz volcano, the Cocora valley and the Tatacoa Desert in the central Andean region, the Farallones de Cali National Natural Park, in the departament of Valle del Cauca; Amacayacu National Park in the Amazon River basin; and the Pacific islands of Malpelo and Gorgona, there other unique landscapes like the river of the seven colors in Meta. As of 2018, there are nine World Heritage Sites in Colombia, including six cultural sites, two natural sites and one mixed site.

National parks 

Colombia has two coastlines; Pacific and Caribbean, three main mountainous chains and the isolated Sierra Nevada de Santa Marta, and many different ecological regions, from páramo to tropical jungle vegetation to desert biomes. The country hosts numerous volcanoes and waterfalls.
 Amacayacu National Park
 Cabo de la Vela
 Chiribiquete National Park
 Cocora valley
 Los Nevados
 Doña Juana-Cascabel Volcanic Complex
 Gorgona and Malpelo islands
 Los Katíos National Park
 Munchique National Park
 Serranía de la Macarena
 Sierra Nevada de Santa Marta National Park
 PANACA Park
 Tayrona Park (Santa Marta)
 Tatacoa Desert
 Chicamocha Canyon National Park
 El Mariposario entomologic display specialized in Lepidoptera
 Peñas Blancas rock climbing site

Safety 

For many years serious internal armed conflict deterred tourists from visiting Colombia, with official travel advisories warning against travel to the country. However, in recent years numbers have risen sharply, thanks to improvements in security resulting from former president and convicted paramilitar Álvaro Uribe's "democratic security" strategy, which has included significant increases in military strength and police presence throughout the country and pushed rebel groups further away from the major cities, highways and tourist sites likely to attract international visitors. Foreign tourist visits were predicted to have risen from 0.6 million in 2007 to 4 million in 2017. Responsible tourism became a peremptory need for Colombia because minimizes negative social, economic and environmental impacts and makes positive contributions to the conservation of natural and cultural heritage.

Travel guide Lonely Planet ranked Colombia second in its list of best countries to visit in 2017. Colombia has been celebrated for its forward-thinking vibrant culture and hospitality.

Transportation

Railways 

The nation's rail network links seven of the country's 10 major cities. During 2004–6, approximately 2,000 kilometers of the country's rail lines underwent refurbishment. This upgrade involved two main projects: the 1,484-kilometer line linking Bogotá to the Caribbean Coast and the 499-kilometer Pacific coastal network that links the industrial city of Cali and the surrounding coffee-growing region to the port of Buenaventura.

Roads 

Highways are managed by the Colombian Ministry of Transport through the National Roads Institute. The security of the highways in Colombia is managed by the Highway Police unit of the Colombian National Police. Colombia is crossed by the Panamerican Highway.

Ports, waterways, and merchant marine 
A well-developed and important form of transport for both cargo and passengers, inland waterways transport approximately 3.8 million metric tons of freight and more than 5.5 million passengers annually. Main inland waterways are the Magdalena–Cauca River system, which is navigable for 1,500 kilometers; the Atrato, which is navigable for 687 kilometers; the Orinoco system of more than five navigable rivers, which total more than 4,000 kilometers of potential navigation (mainly through Venezuela); and the Amazonas system, which has four main rivers totaling 3,000 navigable kilometers (mainly through Brazil). The government is planning an ambitious program to more fully utilize the main rivers for transport.

Aviation 

All public airports in Colombia are managed and controlled by the Special Administrative Unit of Civil Aeronautics.

Colombia has well-developed air routes and an estimated total of 984 airports, 100 of which have paved runways, plus two heliports. Of the 74 main airports, 20 can accommodate jet aircraft. Two airports are more than 3,047 meters in length, nine are 2,438–3,047 meters, 39 are 1,524–2,437 meters, 38 are 914–1,523 meters, 12 are shorter than 914 meters, and 880 have unpaved runways. The government has been selling its stake in local airports in order to allow their privatization. The country has 40 regional airports, and the cities of Bogotá, Medellín, Cali, Barranquilla, Bucaramanga, Cartagena, Cúcuta, Leticia, Pereira, San Andrés, and Santa Marta have international airports. Bogotá's El Dorado International Airport handles 550 million metric tons of cargo and 22 million passengers a year, making it the largest airport in Latin America in terms of cargo and the third largest in passenger numbers.

Urban transport 

Urban transport systems have been developed in Bogotá, Medellín, Cali and Barranquilla. Traffic congestion in Bogotá has been greatly exacerbated by the lack of rail transport. However, this problem has been alleviated somewhat by the development of one of the world's largest and highest capacity bus rapid transit (BRT) systems, known as the TransMilenio (opened 2000), and the restriction of vehicles through a daily, rotating ban on private cars depending on plate numbers. Bogotá's system consists of bus and minibus services managed by both private- and public-sector enterprises. Since 1995 Medellín has had a modern urban railway referred to as the Metro de Medellín, which also connects with the cities of Itagüí, Envigado, and Bello. A BRT line called Transmetro began operating in 2011, with a second line added in 2013.  Other cities have also installed BRT systems such as Cali with a six line system (opened 2008), Barranquilla with two lines (opened 2010), Bucaramanga with one line (opened 2010), Cartagena with one line (opened 2015) and Pereira with three lines (opened 2006).

World Heritage Sites 
As of 2018, there are nine World Heritage Sites in Colombia, including six cultural sites, two natural sites and one mixed site.

Notable celebrations 
Barranquilla's Carnival
Blacks and Whites' Carnival
Holy Week in Popayán

Gallery

See also 
 Visa policy of Colombia
 Jaime Duque Park

References

Bibliography

External links 
 

 
Colombia